Ronald Ralph Schell (born December 23, 1931) is an American actor and stand-up comedian. He appeared on the May 28, 1959, episode of the TV quiz You Bet Your Life, hosted by Groucho Marx. Schell demonstrated a comic barrage of beatnik jive talk. As a  stand-up comedian, he first developed his act at the hungry i nightclub in San Francisco, California. Schell is probably best known for his 1960s television role as Duke Slater in Gomer Pyle, U.S.M.C.

Early life
Schell was born in Richmond, California, on December 23, 1931. Upon graduation from high school, he served four years in the United States Air Force, where he became an airman first class.

Career
In his role as Duke Slater on Gomer Pyle, U.S.M.C., Schell's character was cast for three seasons as a Marine private and best friend of Gomer Pyle. Schell left for a season to star as a disc jockey in his own sitcom, Good Morning World. He then returned to Gomer Pyle, U.S.M.C. as a corporal for its fifth and final season. Schell played Duke Slater as an urban, streetwise character, compared to Pyle's rural, bucolic character, as portrayed by Jim Nabors.  Returning as a corporal, Slater acted more as a mediator between Pyle and Sgt. Carter, portrayed by Frank Sutton, than as a buddy to Pyle.

Schell lent his voice to "Jason" on the animated series Battle of the Planets and co-starred as "Mr. Brown" on The Mouseketeers at Walt Disney World.

His other television guest credits include The Andy Griffith Show, The Patty Duke Show, Phil of the Future, Yes, Dear, The Wayans Bros., Step by Step, Coach, The Golden Girls, 227, Saved by the Bell, Empty Nest, Mr. Belvedere, Santa Barbara, Trapper John, M.D., Too Close for Comfort, The Brian Keith Show, The New Temperatures Rising Show, The Love Boat, Love, American Style, Alice, Mork & Mindy, One Day at a Time, Charlie's Angels, The Dukes of Hazzard, Sanford and Son, Emergency!, Happy Days, Adam-12, The New Dick Van Dyke Show, That Girl, Black Sheep Squadron, and Jessie.

Schell's gradual ascendency into the public's attention earned him the title "America's Slowest Rising Comedian".

Schell also acted in a few Pacific Southwest Airlines (PSA) commercials such as "Smile Inspection" and "PSA Gives You A Lift Pageant". At the end of a Jerry Lewis PSA jingle, a voice said "That was Jerry Lewis for PSA, and this is Ronnie Schell. What did I do wrong?" Schell was the voice for the hockey puck-shaped character on the Peter Puck cartoons, which aired during televised National Hockey League games in the 1970s. From the mid to late 1980s, Schell appeared in numerous television commercials for Shakey's Pizza.

In 2007, Schell was part of a touring cabaret show titled, 5 Star Revue with Gary Collins, Mary Ann Mobley, Ruta Lee, and Steve Rossi. He starred in the 2009 off-Broadway production of Don't Leave it All to Your Children!, a comedic and musical revue dedicated to aging baby boomers.

Schell was the comedy advisor to Richard Dreyfuss in the 2019 Netflix film The Last Laugh.

Personal life
He married Janet Rodeberg in 1968; they have two children, Greg and Chris Schell.

Filmography

Film

Television

References

External links 

 
 
 Ronnie Schell - Kliph Nesteroff interview
 Appearance on You Bet Your Life

1931 births
Living people
American male film actors
American male television actors
American male voice actors
American stand-up comedians
Comedians from California
Male actors from California
National Hockey League broadcasters
Place of birth missing (living people)
People from Richmond, California
San Francisco State University alumni
United States Air Force airmen
20th-century American comedians
21st-century American comedians
20th-century American male actors
21st-century American male actors